Petra Schneider (born 11 January 1963 in Karl-Marx-Stadt, now Chemnitz) is a former medley and freestyle swimmer from East Germany in the 1970s and 1980s.

She won an Olympic gold medal in the 400 m individual medley at the 1980 Summer Olympics in Moscow, and set five world records in swimming. She was named by Swimming World magazine as World Swimmer of the Year in 1980 and 1982, but her achievements are regarded with suspicion due to the state-run systematic doping program run by East Germany. She later admitted to having been doped.

In 2005, she called for her last remaining record (German national record in the 400 m individual medley) to be struck from the record books, because it was achieved with the aid of steroids.

Schneider came to prominence at the 1978 World Championships in Berlin, winning bronze in the 400 m individual medley behind arch-rival Tracy Caulkins of the United States with whom she shares the same birthday. Thereafter, she never lost to Caulkins again, repeatedly lowering Caulkins' world record in the event, three times in 1980 from 4:40.83 to 4:36.29 at the Moscow Olympics, which was boycotted by the United States. She improved her record to 4:36.10 at Guayaquil in 1982 and it was not bettered until 1997.

Schneider's victory in the 400 m event left silver medallist Sharron Davies of the United Kingdom 10 seconds in arrears. This particular victory, however, has been proven to be fraudulent as Schneider later admitted to doping as part of the Stasi era drugs program wherein many female athletes were put on testosterone to enhance their outcome.
She also held the world record in the 200 m individual medley, but was denied a gold medal as the event was canceled for the 1980 games. She also collected a silver medal in the 400 m freestyle.

She repeated her haul at the 1982 World Championships in Ecuador, winning the medley double and a silver in the 400 m freestyle. She also won three European Championships medals and set eight European records. She was also named by Swimming World as the European Swimmer of the Year in 1979 and 1980. However, her Olympic career was ended when the Soviet bloc, including East Germany, staged a retaliatory boycott of the 1984 Summer Olympics held in Los Angeles.

Schneider attributed her success in swimming (prior to admissions of doping) with the quote 
For me swimming is the most beautiful of all sports.  Although I have been training for very many years and have taken part in a great number of competitions, I always find something new in this sport.  And this I'm sure is greatly to the credit of my coach, Eberhard Mothes, who takes my training sessions at the sport club in Karl-Marx-Stadt and never fails to come up with something interesting or challenging in the course of the work.  I am the kind of person who likes being expected to achieve as much as I possibly can.

See also
 List of members of the International Swimming Hall of Fame
 List of German records in swimming

References

1963 births
Living people
Olympic swimmers of East Germany
Swimmers at the 1980 Summer Olympics
Olympic gold medalists for East Germany
Olympic silver medalists for East Germany
East German female medley swimmers
East German female freestyle swimmers
Doping cases in swimming
German sportspeople in doping cases
Sportspeople from Chemnitz
World record setters in swimming
Medalists at the 1980 Summer Olympics
World Aquatics Championships medalists in swimming
European Aquatics Championships medalists in swimming
Olympic gold medalists in swimming
Olympic silver medalists in swimming
Recipients of the Patriotic Order of Merit in silver